Richterite is a sodium calcium magnesium silicate mineral belonging to the amphibole group. If iron replaces the magnesium within the structure of the mineral, it is called ferrorichterite; if fluorine replaces the hydroxyl, it is called fluororichterite. Richterite crystals are long and prismatic, or prismatic to fibrous aggregate, or rock-bound crystals. Colors of richterite range from brown, grayish-brown, yellow, brownish- to rose-red, or pale to dark green. Richterite occurs in thermally metamorphosed limestones in contact metamorphic zones. It also occurs as a hydrothermal product in mafic igneous rocks, and in manganese-rich ore deposits. Localities include Mont-Saint-Hilaire, Quebec, and Wilberforce and Tory Hill, Ontario, Canada; Långban and Pajsberg, Sweden; West Kimberley, Western Australia; Sanka, Myanmar; and, in the US, at Iron Hill, Colorado; Leucite Hills, Wyoming; and Libby, Montana. The mineral was named in 1865 for the German mineralogist Hieronymous Theodor Richter (1824–1898).

References

 Bonewitz, 2008, Smithsonian Rock and Gem

Sodium minerals
Calcium minerals
Magnesium minerals
Amphibole group
Monoclinic minerals
Minerals in space group 12